Bruce Matthews may refer to:

Bruce Matthews (Canadian Army officer), commander of the 2nd Canadian Infantry Division in the Second World War, later President of the Liberal Party of Canada
Bruce Matthews (American football), former NFL football player
Bruce Matthews, List of golf course architects